Saint Ulrich or Saint Ulric may refer to four saints:

 Ulrich of Augsburg (890–973), Bishop of Augsburg and a leader of the German church, saint
 Ulrich of Zell (c. 1029–1093), Cluniac reformer of Germany, abbot, founder and saint
 Wulfric of Holme, also known as Ulric of Holme, 10th-century saint from England
 Wulfric of Haselbury (c. 1080–1154), also known as Ulric of Haselbury, saint from England

Churches named after St. Ulrich 
 St. Ulrich's and St. Afra's Abbey (Augsburg)
 Basilica of SS. Ulrich and Afra, Augsburg
 St. Ulrich's Priory in the Black Forest
 St. Ulrich, Vienna

Places named after St. Ulrich 
 Sankt Ulrich in Gröden, the German name for Urtijëi in South Tyrol, Italy
 Sankt Ulrich im Mühlkreis, a municipality in Upper Austria, Austria
 Sankt Ulrich am Pillersee, a municipality in Tyrol, Austria
 Sankt Ulrich bei Steyr, a municipality in Upper Austria, Austria
 Sankt Ulrich am Waasen, a municipality in Styria, Austria